Lisa Griffith is an Australian cricketer who plays as a right-handed batter and right-arm medium pace bowler. She made her professional debut for the New South Wales Breakers in the 2010–11 Women's National Cricket League before taking a five-year break from cricket. She worked on a family farm in her time away from the game. She returned to cricket for the 2017–18 season, joining Sydney Thunder for the Women's Big Bash League and returning to the Breakers for the Women's National Cricket League. She signed for Western Australia ahead of the 2021–22 Women's National Cricket League and Perth Scorchers ahead of the 2021–22 Women's Big Bash League.

References

External links

Lisa Griffith at Cricket Australia

Living people
1992 births
People from Bathurst, New South Wales
Cricketers from New South Wales
Australian cricketers
Australian women cricketers
New South Wales Breakers cricketers
Otago Sparks cricketers
Perth Scorchers (WBBL) cricketers
Sydney Sixers (WBBL) cricketers
Sydney Thunder (WBBL) cricketers
Western Australia women cricketers